State Route 79 (SR 79) is a north–south highway that traverses Central Ohio, extending from Buckeye Lake at SR 37 to Nellie at US 36. SR 79 serves Newark, providing direct-access from Downtown Newark to I-70.

History

SR 79 was first designated between Lancaster and Walhonding in 1924 by way of Hebron, Newark, and Newcastle. By 1926, the northern terminus had been rerouted to Nellie. In 1959, SR 79 took over most of the routing of SR 157 to end at SR 37, its current southern terminus. This extension occurred around the same time of the completion of I-70 in the area. Except for reroutings onto expressways in Hebron and Newark, the route has not experienced any other major changes.

Until 2005, State Route 79 Alternate (SR 79A) was a  alternate route of SR 79. SR 79A split from SR 79 south of Hebron. SR 79 bypasses Hebron to the east, while SR 79A, or Business Route 79, ran through downtown Hebron as High Street. SR 79A followed High Street as it intersected Enterprise Drive, which ended as SR 79A, at SR 79 north of Hebron.

Major junctions

References

079
Transportation in Fairfield County, Ohio
079
079